This list comprises all players who have participated in at least one league match for D.C. United since the team's first Major League Soccer season in 1996. Players who were on the roster but never played in an MLS game are not listed.

Players
Major League Soccer clubs are currently allowed a roster of 30 players at any one time during the MLS season. Players who were contracted to the club but never played an MLS game are not listed.

All statistics are for the MLS regular season games only, and are correct .

Outfield players

Goalkeepers

Nationality

Club captains 

This a list of people who wore the captain's armband the most times.

References
Notes

Sources

D.C. United
 
Association football player non-biographical articles